Platform fighter is a video game subgenre of fighting games that cover games that emphasize fighting on stages with free 2D movement, similar to a platform game.

Gameplay

Matches take place on a 2D plane, usually on a stage with platforms floating around for the player to use for better movement or attacks. Movement is similar to platform games, where the player is able to move in any direction they like and be able to jump, double jump, or even fly depending on the game. While there have been many games that have been labeled platform fighters, they all generally feature different requirements to achieve victory. This can range from depleting an opponent's health bar, as in most traditional fighting games; knocking out the opponent off the stage; or getting the most points in a match. Many games in the genre have adopted the system pioneered by the Super Smash Bros. series, in which a damage percentage is displayed which indicates how far a player will be knocked back when attacked, in hopes of sending them beyond the stage boundaries.

History
While there have been some 2D fighting games that have used mechanics like platforms in stages like in Savage Reign, these games are not considered platform fighters as they play like traditional 2D fighting games with an added gimmick. Though The Outfoxies was an early example of many of the mechanics featured in most platform fighters, the subgenre would be most defined by the release of Super Smash Bros. in 1999, which was the first game in the subgenre to achieve wide success and defined the mechanics for most games that followed. After the release of the original Super Smash Bros., many companies would release their own games similar in style with some being crossover games like DreamMix TV World Fighters or games with licensed characters like Digimon Rumble Arena and Battle Stadium D.O.N. Teenage Mutant Ninja Turtles: Smash-Up was notably developed by a studio that contributed to Super Smash Bros. Brawl.

In the mid-2010s, indie developers began developing fighting games that imitated the mechanics of Super Smash Bros., including Rivals of Aether, Brawlout, and Brawlhalla. It was around this time that the term "platform fighter" began to be used more frequently to refer to games similar to Super Smash Bros.  Following the success of Super Smash Bros. Ultimate in 2018, new platform fighters have emerged based on various licensed properties, such as Nickelodeon All-Star Brawl, Fraymakers, and MultiVersus.

References

 
Video game genres
Video game terminology